Ira Laga Wadi (translation:  Sun is too Closer) is a 2013 Sri Lankan Sinhala adult drama film directed by Chandraratne Mapitigama and produced by Ruwanthi Films. It stars Sanath Gunathilake and Dilhani Ekanayake in lead roles along with Sanath Wimalasiri and Rajitha Hiran. Music composed by Nawarathna Gamage. It is the 1191st Sri Lankan film in the Sinhala cinema.

Cast
 Sanath Gunathilake as Saliya
 Dilhani Ekanayake as Sewwandi
 Rajitha Hiran as Rajitha
 Nilanthi Dias
 Sanath Wimalasiri as Kumara
 Ruwanthi Mangala as Savithri
 Vishaka Siriwardana as Vishaka
 Wijeratne Warakagoda as Wijeratne
 Ishan Gammudali
 Saman Almeida as Saman
 Miyuri Samarasinghe

Soundtrack

References

2013 films
2010s Sinhala-language films